Love and Bullets is a 1979  action crime film directed by Stuart Rosenberg. and starring Charles Bronson, it is based on a screenplay by Wendell Mayes and John Melson.

The film was originally to have been directed by John Huston and advertisements were taken out in Variety to promote this fact. Huston apparently did film some scenes but walked off the set after disagreements with the producers. Veteran director Rosenberg stepped in on the troubled production. The resulting movie received almost-unanimously poor reviews.

Plot
Phoenix Police Detective Charlie Congers is tasked to assist the FBI in bringing a gangster's girlfriend, Jackie Pruitt, back to the USA to testify. The FBI thinks she can give incriminating information to law enforcement that will put Joe Bomposa behind bars for life.

It turns out that Pruitt doesn't know much of anything useful to the FBI. The trouble is, Bomposa is forced by his mafia peers to have her "whacked" anyway, at the exorbitant cost of $1 million, for a vicious, amoral, disloyal, Italian hitman.

While Congers is falling in love with her, Pruitt is shot as she embraces Congers, before she leaves for the US under the protection of the FBI.
Bomposa arranges to have the Italian hitman killed for overcharging him.
Congers delivers a casket, flowers, a foreboding note "Love and bullets, Charlie" and a bomb to Bamposa's mansion, which kills the Don and his mafia lieutenants.

Cast

Production
In 1977 it was announced that John Huston would direct Charles Bronson and Jill Ireland in Love and Bullets from a script by Wendell Mayes, who had written Bronson's hit film Death Wish. Finance would come from Lew Grade's ITC Entertainment. It was part of a $97 million slate of movies Grade was making which also included The Legend of the Lone Ranger, Movie Movie (then called Double Feature), The Boys from Brazil, Raise the Titanic, The Golden Gate from the Alistair MacLean novel (never made), Escape to Athena, The Muppet Movie and Road to the Fountain of Youth with Bing Crosby and Bob Hope (which was never made). Filming on Love and Bullets - then called Love and Bullets, Charlie - was to begin in Managua, Nicaragua on 3 November 1977. By this stage Huston had fallen ill and been replaced as director by Stuart Rosenberg.

Reception

Critical response
Roger Ebert of the Chicago Sun-Times gave the film one-and-a-half stars out of four and wrote, "Love and Bullets is a hopelessly confused hodgepodge of chases, killings, enigmatic meetings and separations, and insufferably overacted scenes by Steiger alternating with alarmingly underacted scenes by Bronson ... It's all texture and no plot, which is fine for a travelog but not so hot for a thriller. There's so little dialog we begin to suspect that's deliberate: Has the wordage in this movie been kept to a minimum to make it easier to dub for the international market?" Janet Maslin of The New York Times wrote, "The British-born Miss Ireland has no luck in affecting a hillbilly accent, and as a comic pretense she's simply not there. However, she and Mr. Bronson approach each other with an appealing ease, which would be more appealing if it were not the movie's only selling point. Mr. Bronson grows ever more coolly dependable with each new film, but 'Love and Bullets' is too clumsy to show him off to much advantage." A review in Variety reported, "There are hints throughout of sharper characterizations and less superficial relationships, but these are hampered by unambitious dialog and repeatedly trite situations." Gene Siskel of the Chicago Tribune gave the film two stars out of four and called it "a dull, dull chase film" that "works only as a travelog for Swiss ski resorts, and it would have been improved vastly if it contained subtitles identifying the fancy lodges Bronson and Ireland occupy." Kevin Thomas of the Los Angeles Times called the film "an instance of the familiar made diverting through some decent writing, taut direction and solid principal performances by Charles Bronson, Jill Ireland and Rod Steiger." Richard Combs of The Monthly Film Bulletin wrote, "Love and Bullets may not be the worst, but it is a relatively dismaying example of the Lew Grade entertainment formula: as locations, production values and clichéd set-pieces proliferate, scripts increasingly look like shaggy-dog stories desperately in search of a point, and actors are left to do their own thing as their characters disintegrate."

References

External links

1979 films
1970s crime drama films
1970s crime action films
1970s chase films
American crime action films
American crime drama films
British crime action films
British crime drama films
Films directed by Stuart Rosenberg
Films set in Switzerland
Films scored by Lalo Schifrin
ITC Entertainment films
1979 drama films
1970s English-language films
1970s American films
1970s British films